Natalia del mar (English: Natalie Of The Sea) is a 2011 Venezuelan telenovela created by Alberto Gómez for Venevisión.
 
Sabrina Salvador and Manuel Sosa star as main protagonists while Víctor Cámara, Fedra López, Rosalinda Serfaty and Juliet Lima star as the main antagonists.

Venevisión began broadcasting Natalia del Mar on June 28, 2011 at 2:00 pm

Plot 
Natalia del mar is the beautiful story a young poor girl who should struggle to feel happy again. The competition between the two families Uzcátegui and Moncada make the family members struggle and suffer. In her childhood she had a friend, Luis Manuel Moncada, from a rich family and then he left for the US to study. From inside the twist of passion, hatred and war Natalia meets Luis Manuel Moncada again. He is surprised to see a young beautiful woman while she was always in love with him. Natalia lives with her grandfather Jacinto who is the magician and miracle-monger along with the siblings Domingo and Rosarito. Natalia feels a lack of education and she strives to study to grow since she is tired of being neglected and humiliated for being illiterate. In spite of her bad clothes and her insubordinate personality, Natalia dreams of marrying Luis Manuel.

Eventually, the two rival families come to end the war and make up. The children, Luis Manuel and Perla are agreed to get married. In the past Valerio Moncada, Luis' father, and Adolfo Uzcátegui, Perla's father, were in love in one and the same woman, Natalia's mother but the story ended tragically. They were bitter enemies though later they have changed plans and even decided to make up and unite into the family. The whole story is spoilt with Sarah, Adolfo's sister, an ambitious and prudent woman who is able to commit crimes to meet her necessity in money and power.

Cast

Main cast 
Sabrina Salvador as Natalia Uribe / Paulina de Uzcátegui
Manuel Sosa as Luis Manuel Moncada

Also as main cast 
Víctor Cámara as Adolfo Uzcátegui
Rosalinda Serfaty as Irene López
Eduardo Serrano as Valerio Moncada
Dora Mazzone as Pasionaria López
Flor Elena González as Eleonora
Juliet Lima as Perla Uzcátegui 
Adrián Delgado as Octavio Valladares
Yul Bürkle as Father Baltazar
Fedra López as Sara Morales
Franklin Virgüez as Baldomero Sánchez
Christian McGaffney as Domingo Uribe 
Maria Antonieta Castillo as Loly Montesinos
Victor Drija as Gerardo Moncada
Gioia Arismendi as Candy Romero
Damián Genovese as Ernesto Valderrama
Roberto Lamarca as Teodoro Rivas
Esther Orjuela as Fernanda de Rivas
Rosita Vásquez as Pastora Pérez
Romelia Agüero as Carmela Díaz
Fernando Flores as Jacinto Uribe

Supporting cast 
Dayra Lambis as Vivianita de Sánchez
Juvel Vielma as Piraña
Vanessa Pallás as Mariana Moncada
Rosanna Zanetti as Patricia Uzcátegui
Juliette Pardau as Rosarito Uribe
Daniel Martínez-Campos as Julián Uzcátegui
Héctor Peña as Álvaro Moncada
Nany Továr as Sandra Pérez
Rosmel Bustamante as Pulpito

Special participation 
Gigi Zanchetta as Mirtha
Félix Loreto as Ramón Calzada
Veronica Montes as Mariela
 Mirtha Perez as Malua
Magaly Serrano as Karen
Leycang El Grandioso as himself

Venezuela broadcast
 Release dates, episode name & length, based on Venevisión's broadcast.

References

External links

Venezuelan telenovelas
2011 telenovelas
2011 Venezuelan television series debuts
2012 Venezuelan television series endings
Venevisión telenovelas
2010s Venezuelan television series
Spanish-language telenovelas
Television shows set in Venezuela